Tetrops is a small genus of longhorn beetles found in Eurasia. One species, Tetrops praeustus, has recently been introduced in Eastern North America.

Species
Tetrops algiricus
 Tetrops bicoloricornis
Tetrops bivittulatus
Tetrops brunneicornis
Tetrops elaeagni
Tetrops formosus
Tetrops gilvipes
Tetrops hauseri
Tetrops mongolicus
Tetrops praeustus
Tetrops rosarum
Tetrops songaricus
Tetrops starkii
Tetrops warnckei

External links

Tetropini